Jim Joy (born April 18, 1977) is an American politician serving in the Minnesota House of Representatives since 2023. A member of the Republican Party of Minnesota, Joy represents District 4B in northwestern Minnesota, which includes the cities of Detroit Lakes and Dilworth and parts of Becker and Clay Counties.

Early life, education and career 
Joy was born and grew up in Detroit Lakes, Minnesota. He has served as a volunteer firefighter and on the police reserve. Joy was on the Hawley, Minnesota, City Council for two years and served as mayor for six years.

Minnesota House of Representatives 
Joy was elected to the Minnesota House of Representatives in 2022, after the incumbent, Paul Marquart, retired. He serves on the State and Local Government Finance and Policy Committee and the Taxes Committee.

Electoral history

Personal life 
Joy lives in Hawley, Minnesota, with his wife, Stephanie, and their three children.

References

External links 

Living people
1977 births
Republican Party members of the Minnesota House of Representatives
21st-century American politicians
Minnesota city council members
Mayors of places in Minnesota
People from Detroit Lakes, Minnesota
People from Hawley, Minnesota